Radio SWH Rock is a radio station broadcasting in Latvia.

Radio stations in Latvia
Companies based in Riga
Mass media in Riga